Meliti is a former municipality in Florina regional unit, West Macedonia, Greece. Since the 2011 local government reform it is part of the municipality Florina, of which it is a municipal unit. The municipal unit has an area of 269.477 km2. The seat of the municipality was in Neochoraki.

Subdivisions
The municipal unit Meliti is subdivided into the following communities (constituent villages in brackets):
Neochoraki (Neochoraki, Agios Athanasios)
Achlada (Achlada, Ano Achlada, Giourouki)
Vevi
Itea
Lofoi
Meliti
Palaistra
Pappagiannis
Sitaria
Skopos
Tripotamos

Demographics
According to the 2011 census, the population of Meliti Municipality was 7,803 people. The municipality has a mixed population of  Slavophone Greeks and the descendants of Greek refugees from Asia Minor.

References

External links
Meliti Municipality 

Former municipalities in Western Macedonia
Populated places in Florina (regional unit)

bg:Вощарани (дем)